The Udhna–Jalgaon line is part of the Howrah–Allahabad–Mumbai line. It connects Surat and Jalgaon in the Indian states of Gujarat and Maharashtra. Vyara (VYA) is the nearest railway station to Kakrapar Atomic Power Station and Ukai Dam and Ukai Thermal Power Station. This line is one of the branch lines of Bhusawal–Kalyan section.

History

The line includes a double-line system, with electric traction.

References

External links
 

5 ft 6 in gauge railways in India
Rail transport in Maharashtra
Railway lines in Gujarat
Transport in Surat